Antonio Ford Aquitania (born January 16, 1977) is a Filipino actor, comedian, host, and model. He is a former member of Bubble Gang.

Early career
Aquitania's first appearance was as a latter cast member of a long running comedy sitcom Palibhasa Lalake from 1995 on ABS-CBN and also he was made a guest in a drama anthology on Maalaala Mo Kaya also on Channel 2 until he decided and transferred to GMA Network also the same year and also an original cast member of Bubble Gang with co stars Ogie Alcasid, Michael V., Wendell Ramos, Assunta De Rossi and all other casts members was premiered in 1995. Until 2022, Antonio and Michael V. were the only two remaining original cast members of the show. He left in May 2022, following the show's revamp. Antonio's debut movie was Kabilin Bilinan ng Lola with his longtime best friend Wendell Ramos and produced by Regal Entertainment in 1996.  Antonio's 1st VIVA Entertainment movie was Sex Drive also with Wendell Ramos in 2003.  His recent movie was a VIVA gospel drama movie Felix Manalo with co star Dennis Trillo in 2015.  As of 2019, Antonio is still active in showbiz and he also wants to make another Kapuso teleserye anytime soon. As of 2020, Antonio was recently return in a former Korean Drama remake of “Descendants Of The Sun Philippine Adaptations” was premiered last February 2020, with his co-lead stars former TGIS Star Dingdong Dantes, Starstruck Season 1 Champion Jennylyn Mercado, Starstruck Alumni Rocco Nacino & Fil-Aussie Actress Jasmine Curtis, the Philippine adaptation of the Korean drama series was ended around December 2020.

Current career
Antonio had also a hosting skills like his another comedy gag show Oooops also with his longtime best friend Wendell Ramos in 1996.

Antonio also seen in a remake of Korean Drama Series Temptation of Wife in 2012.

Antonio recently seen in his afternoon drama series Kakambal ni Eliana with co-star Kim Rodriguez in 2013.

Antonio also ventured to comedy anthology series Dear Uge in 2017, 2018, and again in 2019.

He is also seen in Ika-5 Utos in 2018.

Personal life
Antonio is Karla Estrada's cousin. His cousin's son Daniel Padilla is also an actor, host and a singer.

Filmography

Television

Film
Ang Taran Tanods (Michaelangelo Productions, 2019)
Hapi ng Buhay (EBC Films, 2018)
Felix Manalo (Viva Films, 2015)
10,000 Hours (Viva Films, 2013)
Coming Soon (Viva Films, 2013)
Boy Pick-Up the Movie (Regal Entertainment & GMA Pictures, 2012)
Working Girls (Viva Films, 2010)
Pasukob (Octoarts Films, 2007)
Enteng Kabisote 3 (M-Zet Films, 2006)
Ispiritista: Itay, May Moomoo (M-Zet Films, 2005)
Masikip sa Dibdib: The Boobita Rose Story (Viva Films, 2004)
Captain Barbell (Viva Films, 2003)
Sex Drive (Viva Films, 2003)
Nympha (Regal Entertainment, 2003)
Hibla (Cinema One Productions, 2002)
Most Wanted (Regal Entertainment, 2000)
Banatan (Regal Entertainment, 1999)
Impakto (Regal Entertainment, 1996)
Kabilin-bilinan ni Lola (Regal Entertainment, 1996)

References

External links

1977 births
Living people
Filipino male comedians
Filipino male models
Filipino male television actors
GMA Network personalities
Male actors from Pampanga
Members of Iglesia ni Cristo
People from Angeles City